The 1954–55 Hovedserien was the 11th completed season of top division football in Norway.

Overview
It was contested by 16 teams, and Larvik Turn won the championship, their second league title.

Teams and locations
Note: Table lists in alphabetical order.

League tables

Group A

Group B

Results

Group A

Group B

Championship final
Larvik Turn 4–2 Fredrikstad

References
Norway - List of final tables (RSSSF)

Eliteserien seasons
Norway
1
1